Serrell is a surname. Notable people with the surname include:

Barney Serrell (1920–1996), American baseball player
Edward W. Serrell (1826–1906), American civil engineer and Civil War veteran
Orlando Serrell (born 1968), American acquired savant
Philip Serrell (born 1954), British auctioneer, antiques expert and television presenter.